Indri (Yanderika, Yandirika) is a Ubangian language of South Sudan.

References

Languages of South Sudan
Sere languages